JSG may refer to:
 Jackson School of Geosciences
 Jade Solid Gold
 Jaydon Sciré Giesekam
 Jewish Socialists' Group
Jean-Sébastien Giguère
 Jharsuguda railway station
 Stirling railway station, Perth
 Junk Shop Glam